Tiberio Mitri (12 July 1926 in Trieste – 12 February 2001 in Rome) was an Italian boxer who fought from 1946 to 1957. During his career, Mitri was the Italian and European middleweight champion.

Mitri's professional debut, was 1 August 1946, and over the span of his first four years of fighting, racked up an undefeated record of 50–0. During this period, he won the Italian middleweight crown by defeating Giovanni Manca (1948), then added the European title with a points win over Cyrille Dellannoit of Belgium. He first defended the European honors, by decisioning Jean Stock of France.

It was on the strength of this resume, Mitri won the right to challenge for the world middleweight championship...though, perversely, he landed the opportunity, as a substitute for Rocky Graziano. On 11 July 1950, at Madison Square Garden, Mitri lost to middleweight champion Jake LaMotta, in a 15-round decision. Sources regarding the closeness of the contest, vary. The Encyclopedia of Boxing, compiled by Gilbert Odd (First Edition, 1983), has Mitri losing on points "narrowly". Jake LaMotta's famed autobiography, ""Raging Bull"" (1970), is rather less charitable.
LaMotta, in standard candor, does not lend credit to Mitri for his staying the distance, stating that according to sports publicity, "(Mitri) was a pretty good fighter, a lot like (Marcel) Cerdan", then opining, "Like Cerdan, he wasn't." LaMotta backs this negative assessment of Mitri, by questioning Mitri's balance in the ring, underlining the tenet of professional prizefighting, towit, "one thing a top fighter rarely is, is off balance." LaMotta claims that this bad balance issue, accounted for the fight lasting the 15, "because it's hard to fight that kind of fighter". LaMotta viewed any taking of chances as unnecessary, e.g. "I was piling up points so fast..."
In fairness to the subject, boxrec.com lists the official scores (NY State Athletic Commission rules, ca. 1950, allowing for a "rounds basis", as won), as follows:
referee: Mark Conn 3-12
judge: Joe Agnello 6-9
judge: Bert Grant 7-8 boxrec.com

Mitri's most famous win came soon after, at the expense of former world middleweight champion Randy Turpin. On, 2 May 1954, fighting in Rome, Mitri scored a surprising upset, knocking out Turpin in only 65 seconds, to reclaim the European middleweight crown. Mitri at last lost his E.B.U. honors, when stopped by France's Charlie Humez, in 3. Mitri fought for another 2 years, chalking only one loss against 18 victories. His most memorable fight, was on New Year's Day, 11:30PM, Sunday January 1, 1956, as a New Year's main event. Mitri, still the Italian & European Middleweight champ, won this famous & exciting bout (by TKO/RTD) when his opponent Bill Jo Cohen refused to answer the bell for the 8th round. Mitri was ahead on points, at the time of stoppage.

Mitri, one of the few boxers who traveled to fight widely outside Italy, retired in 1957, having logged a total of 99 professional tiffs.

Mitri also acted in popular Italian cinema.

References

External links
 The autobiography of Tiberio Mitri: La botta in testa

1926 births
2001 deaths
Middleweight boxers
Sportspeople from Trieste
Italian male film actors
Italian male boxers